Kerly is a feminine given name.

People named Kerly include:
Kerly Théus (born 1999), Haitian footballer
Kerly Santos (born 1970), Brazilian volleyball player

Feminine given names